Rossington Main Football Club is an English football club based in Rossington, Doncaster, South Yorkshire. They play in the Northern Counties East League Division One, at level 10 of the English football league system.

History

The club came into existence in 1919 as Rossington Main Colliery, making their FA Cup debut in 1921. They competed in the FA Cup until the Second World War, reaching the 4th Qualifying Round in 1924, losing 0–3 to Lincoln City.

They played in local leagues such as the Doncaster & District Senior League and Sheffield Association League up to the 1970s (having changed their name to Rossington Miners Welfare in 1948), before entering the Yorkshire League in 1975. Their stay in this league lasted just five seasons, finishing in the lower echelons of Division Three on each occasion.

The club entered the Central Midlands League (CMFL) in 1983 after renaming themselves Rossington Main. They won the Premier Division title in 1985 and were promoted to the Supreme Division a year later. In 1991 they joined the Northern Counties East League (NCEL), entering Division One.

In 1998, the club amalgamated with Rossington F.C., who had been members of the CMFL (although never in the same division as Main). Although officially a merger, Main were the senior partner and their name and league placing was retained.

They have remained in Division One since joining the league, only finishing as high as 7th, in 2012.

In 2022, Rossington Main had their most successful season since going division 1, finishing 5th in the league with 81 points from 40 games. They lost 2-0 in the first round of the playoffs to North Ferriby FC.

Season-by-season record

Notable former players
Players that have played in the Football League either before or after playing for Rossington Main –

  Jamie Green
  Ken Hardwick
  Gary Jones
  Joe Lievesley
  Leslie Lievesley
  Brian Makepeace

  George Shaw
  Wilf Shaw
  Ron Spence
  Zephaniah Thomas
  Jack Teasdale
 Bobby Faulkner

Ground
The club plays at Oxford Street in Rossington, postcode DN11 0TD.

Honours

League
Central Midlands League Premier Division
Champions: 1984–85
Promoted: 1985–86
Doncaster & District Senior League
Champions: 1944–45

Cup
Central Midlands Football League Cup
Winners 1983–84
Doncaster & District Senior League Cup
Winners: 1944–45
Doncaster & District Senior League Premier Division Cup
Winners: 1973–74

Records
Best League performance: 5th in Northern Counties East League Division One, 2011–12
Best FA Cup performance: 4th Qualifying Round, 1924–25
Best FA Vase performance: 2nd Round, 1988–89
Record attendance: 1,425 vs. Doncaster Rovers, pre-season friendly, 2016–17

References

External links
Official website

Football clubs in England
Football clubs in South Yorkshire
Sport in the Metropolitan Borough of Doncaster
Association football clubs established in 1919
1919 establishments in England
Sheffield & Hallamshire County FA members
Doncaster & District Senior League
Sheffield Association League
Yorkshire Football League
Central Midlands Football League
Northern Counties East Football League
Mining association football teams in England